Odorrana indeprensa  is a true frog species in the family Ranidae, described first by Bain and Stuart 2006.

The species is endemic to Thailand and known from Khao Yai National Park only.

References

External links
 Species of Khao Yai National Park
 Flickr photo by Michael Cota
 Flickr photo by Michael Cota

Amphibians of Thailand
Frogs of Asia
Amphibians described in 2006
indeprensa